Arthur Hill Cambridge (25 December 1901 – 30 July 1955) was an Australian rules footballer who played for the Melbourne Football Club in the Victorian Football League (VFL).

Notes

External links 

1901 births
Australian rules footballers from Victoria (Australia)
Melbourne Football Club players
South Bendigo Football Club players
1955 deaths